Gateside is a hamlet in the county of Angus, Scotland. It lies 7 miles south of Forfar on the A90 road.

References

Villages in Angus, Scotland